The Executive Council of the Northern Cape is the cabinet of the executive branch of the provincial government in the South African province of the Northern Cape. The Members of the Executive Council (MECs) are appointed from among the members of the Northern Cape Provincial Legislature by the Premier of the Northern Cape, an office held since the 2019 general election by Zamani Saul of the African National Congress (ANC).

Jenkins premiership: 2009–2013 
On 11 May 2009, shortly after the 2009 general election, newly elected Premier Hazel Jenkins announced her new Executive Council. The council remained in place under Grizelda Cjiekella, the Education MEC, who acted as Premier after Jenkins suffered a stroke while delivering her 2012 State of the Province Address.

Lucas premiership

First term: 2013–2014 
In May 2013, Sylvia Lucas was sworn in as Northern Cape Premier after Hazel Jenkins formally resigned from the office. She retained Jenkins's Executive Council until 4 June 2013, when she announced a minor cabinet reshuffle, moving some MECs to new portfolios and appointing Tiny Chotelo and Mac Jack to fill vacancies created by her own election as Premier and the election of Kenny Mmoiemang as the Speaker of the Northern Cape Provincial Legislature.

Second term: 2014–2019 
Lucas was elected to her first full term as Premier in the 2014 general election and she announced her new Executive Council on 30 May 2014. Although several MECs changed portfolios, only two from the previous term – Patrick Mabilo and Pauline Williams – were dropped entirely; Lebogang Motlhaping and Barbara Bartlett were appointed in their stead. In late February 2016, Lucas announced a wide-ranging reshuffle in which only three MECs retained their original portfolios, although none were fired. Three vacancies had arisen due to the death of Education MEC Grizelda Cjiekella, the resignation of Finance MEC John Block, and the resignation of Public Works MEC Dawid Rooi; three new MECs – Bongiwe Mbinqo-Gigaba, Gift van Staden, and Pauline Williams (who had been an MEC until 2014) – were appointed in their stead.

On 10 May 2017, Lucas announced a controversial reshuffle, in which Bongiwe Mbinqo-Gigaba and Mxolisi Sokatsha swopped portfolios, and, more significantly, Finance MEC Mac Jack and Transport MEC Pauline Williams were fired and replaced by Gail Parker and Alexandra Beukes respectively. The Northern Cape branch of the ANC said that it had not been consulted about the reshuffle and responded with "absolute disgust", calling it "grossly irresponsible, reckless and self-serving" and alleging that it constituted an attempt by Lucas to influence the outcomes of a party elective conference scheduled for the next weekend. The provincial party called for Lucas to reverse the reshuffle and the ANC National Executive Committee ultimately intervened to instruct her to do so; on 1 June, Lucas announced that she would comply, meaning that Parker and Beukes would lose their new positions.

In February 2018, Lucas announced another reshuffle, removing Alvin Botes and Lebogang Motlhaping from the Executive Council and appointing Bentley Vass and Fufe Makatong. Lucas said that her decision had been influenced by the ANC's decision to move Botes to the National Assembly and by the need to ensure that senior party officials were represented in the Executive Council; Vass and Makatong were the Northern Cape ANC's Deputy Provincial Chairperson and Provincial Treasurer respectively.

Saul premiership: 2019–present 
On 29 May 2019, after the 2019 general election, newly elected Premier Zamani Saul announced his new Executive Council, which retained only three MECs from the previous administration and which merged the province's Agriculture and Land Reform portfolio with Environmental Affairs and Conservation. After Berenice Sinexve and Barbara Bartlett resigned, Saul announced his first reshuffle on 26 June 2020; all but two MECs changed portfolios, but none were fired. 

Education MEC Mac Jack died in August 2020 and was replaced by Zolile Monakali in September. On 26 October 2022, Saul appointed Venus Blennies as MEC for Youth, Women, Disability, Communications and E-Government, a newly created portfolio located in the Office of the Premier.

See also 

 Template:Northern Cape Executive Council
 Government of South Africa
 Constitution of South Africa
 Cape Province

References 

Government of the Northern Cape